Kenneth Roth (born September 23, 1955) is an American attorney, human rights activist, and writer. He was the executive director of Human Rights Watch (HRW) from 1993 to 2022.

Early life
Kenneth Roth was born on September 23, 1955, in Elmhurst, Illinois, to Muriel T. Roth and Walter S. Roth. His father was a Jewish refugee who fled Nazi Germany. Walter's family had a butchery in Germany near Frankfurt when Adolf Hitler came to power.

Kenneth Roth grew up in Deerfield, Illinois. He graduated from Brown University in 1977 with a BA in history and received his JD from Yale Law School in 1980.

On June 13, 2011, Roth was married in an Anglican church to Dr. Annie Sparrow.

Career

Roth worked in private practice as a litigator and served as a Assistant United States Attorney for the United States Department of Justice for the Southern District of New York and the Iran-Contra investigation in Washington DC. Roth's career in human rights began inauspiciously. The one human rights course offered at Yale Law School was repeatedly canceled, and upon graduation he found that jobs in the field were few. As a result, as he worked as a lawyer, and volunteered nights and weekends doing human rights work, focusing on the Soviet imposition of martial law in Poland in 1981.

Roth joined Human Rights Watch (HRW) in 1987 as deputy director. His initial work centered on Haiti and gradually extended to Cuba and the Middle East, among other places.

Since 1993 (when Aryeh Neier left to become head of George Soros's Open Society Institute), Roth became the executive director of HRW. While he was in the office, the HRW staff increased from 60 to 552; HRW shared the Nobel Peace Prize in 1997 for banning of anti-personnel mines, helped to establish International Criminal Court and ban children in the military. Roth resigned from HRW on 31 August 2022. After leaving HRW, Roth said he intended to write a book.

Roth received honorary degrees from Brown University, Bowdoin College, the University of Ottawa, and the American University of Paris. He was a recipient of the Athens Democracy Award, the William Rogers Award from Brown University and the Jean Mayer Global Citizenship Award from Tufts University. He serves on the Watson Institute Board of Overseers at Brown University, the Board of Governors of Bard College Berlin, and the Humanitarian and Development Advisory Panel of the Novo Nordisk Foundation.

Controversies

Remarks on Israel's policies
Following a 2006 HRW report on the 2006 lebanon war, Roth wrote a letter to the editor of The New York Sun in which he criticized the Israeli response to Hezbollah's rocket attacks on northern Israeli towns by quoting the Old Testament: "An eye for an eye—or, more accurately in this case, twenty eyes for an eye—may have been the morality of some more primitive moment." In reaction, the Anti-Defamation League accused him of using a "classic anti-Semitic stereotype against Jews". A following editorial in The New York Sun decried the statement: "To suggest that Judaism is a primitive religion incompatible with contemporary morality is to engage in supersessionism, the de-legitimization of Judaism, the basis of much antisemitism". Georgetown law professor and columnist Rosa Brooks called this criticism of Roth an example of reflexive labeling of criticism of Israel as antisemitism, and said that anyone accusing Roth of antisemitism must be "insane".

HRW founder Robert Bernstein said to The Jerusalem Post in April 2011 that in relation to the United Nations Fact Finding Mission on the Gaza Conflict, which issued the Goldstone Report, Roth "seeks to minimize the importance of Judge Goldstone's stunning retraction of his war crime accusations against Israel." Bernstein said of Roth, "it is time for him to follow Judge Goldstone's example and issue his own mea culpa." On 14 April 2011, the U.N report's three other co-authors released a joint statement criticizing Goldstone's partial recantation.

In 2014, Roth tweeted, "Germans rally against anti-Semitism that flared in Europe in response to Israel's conduct in Gaza war. Merkel joins." Jeffrey Goldberg of The Atlantic criticized Roth, saying Roth "blame[d] the Jewish state for the violent acts of anti-Semites" and that "it is a universal and immutable rule that the targets of prejudice are not the cause of prejudice." Raphael Magarik disagreed with Goldberg in an opinion for The Forward, writing "denying that Israel’s behavior has any causal role in anti-Semitism is deeply counter-intuitive." Michael Rubin, of the American Enterprise Institute called for Roth to step down stating that he "appears increasingly intent to subordinate the organization he leads to a much more limited and subjective political agenda." Roth also tweeted a controversial advertisement equating the war with "Nazi genocide" followed by the Holocaust tagline "Never again". United States Special Envoy for Monitoring and Combating Anti-Semitism Deborah Lipstadt called this language "soft-core denigration of the Holocaust". In April 2015, Steven A. Cook, the Hasib J. Sabbagh senior fellow for Middle Eastern Studies at the Council on Foreign Relations, criticized Roth for his tweets critical of Israel, which sent humanitarian aid to Nepal during the April 2015 Nepal earthquake. Roth tweeted, "Easier to address a far-away humanitarian disaster than the nearby one of Israel's making in Gaza. End the blockade!"  In a 2017 opinion for The Forward, Daniel Kohn claimed that Roth had established a Middle East/North Africa (MENA) team composed of what he termed anti-Israel activists. In 2020, the Algemeiner Journal wrote, "Roth has long been noted for his hatred of Israel and his use of antisemitic rhetoric to attack it."

In 2021, Roth tweeted: "Antisemitism is always wrong, and it long preceded the creation of Israel, but the surge in UK antisemitic incidents during the recent Gaza conflict gives the lie to those who pretend that the Israeli government's conduct doesn't affect antisemitism." American Jewish Committee director David Harris responded: "No, antisemitism is always wrong, period. Just as racism is always wrong, period. Coming from an alleged human rights defender, totally & utterly despicable". The Anti-Defamation League said: "blaming Israel for the recent rise in violent antisemitic incidents, instead of blaming the antisemitic actors themselves, is plainly false and offensive" The Community Security Trust said: "Kenneth Roth's tweet is a typical example of how Israel, Jews and antisemitism appear to be treated differently to other types of racism". After the backlash, Roth deleted his post, tweeting, "I deleted an earlier tweet because people misinterpreted its wording", but did not apologize, writing, "Interesting how many people pretend that this tweet justifies antisemitism (it doesn't and I don't under any circumstances), rather than address the correlation…between recent Israeli government conduct in Gaza and the rise of UK antisemitic incidents."

Harvard Kennedy School 

In 2021, Roth was offered a fellowship at the Harvard Kennedy School's Carr Center for Human Rights Policy. The offer was withdrawn in 2023. Roth said that the withdrawal was because of his criticism of Israel. Michael Massing reported Roth's claims in the Nation. Roth told the Guardian and Amy Goodman on Democracy Now that he believed Harvard Kennedy School dean Douglas Elmendorf had capitulated to Harvard's donors who are strong supporters of Israel. Kennedy school professor Kathryn Sikkink said she was told that Elmendorf thought Human Rights Watch has an "anti-Israel bias" and that Roth’s tweets on Israel were concerning, points she disputed with the dean. Following Roth's complaint, the ACLU, Pen America, and other human rights activists condemned the Kennedy School's decision. On January 10, 2023, HRW published a letter to Harvard President Lawrence Bacow that said it was concerned about a "lasting impact on scholars and activists, particularly Palestinians, who should not have to fear professional repercussions from Harvard University or another institution if they write or speak critically about the Israeli government". Following those reports, hundreds of Harvard affiliates called on Elmendorf to resign.

On January 19, 2023, The Kennedy School, which denies Roth's accusation, reversed its decision, reoffering Roth the fellowship. Elmendorf said that his initial decision had been in "error" and was not intended "to limit debate at the Kennedy School about human rights in any country". Roth responded that Elmendorf failed to say anything to identify the people "who matter to him" who he said were behind his original veto decision. "Full transparency is key to ensuring that such influence is not exerted in other cases", Roth said, adding: "Secondly, I remain worried about academic freedom. Given my three decades leading Human Rights Watch, I was able to shine an intense spotlight on Dean Elmendorf’s decision, but what about others? The problem of people penalized for criticizing Israel is not limited to me."

Rwanda genocide
In 2010, Fred Oluoch-Ojiwah of Rwanda's New Times questioned Roth's impartiality and equated Roth's criticism of Rwanda's human rights record to a "love affair" with the "genocidaires" that carried out the Rwandan Genocide of 1994.

In a later article, Oluoch-Ojiwah wrote: "As a western human rights personality [Roth]... will always fail to understand the intricacies and complexities surrounding the 1994 Genocide against Tutsi. Wrapping it up simplistically the way he has done will only serve to undo the gains already registered in driving the very delicate process of bringing forth a new dispensation in Rwanda and by extension the African Great Lakes region."

Acceptance of donation with non-LGBT rights provision 
In 2013, HRW accepted a $487,000 gift from Saudi billionaire Mohamed Bin Issa Al Jaber. The donation was solicited and managed by Roth. The donor had been the subject of HRW investigation up through 2012 for coercive business practices. Roth agreed to the Saudi demand that HRW not use this donation to support LGBT rights advocacy in the Middle East and North Africa.

In 2020, HRW returned the donation to the Saudi billionaire. Acceptance of this donation by Roth led to internal disputes over whether this violated HRW ethics policies and over Roth's decision-making, though it did not affect Roth's status at HRW.

Denied entry

Egypt 
In 2014, the Egyptian government blocked Roth from entering the country. He was traveling to Egypt to release a report on its government's August 2013 Rabaa massacre of 817 sit-in protesters.

China 
In December 2019, China announced unspecified sanctions against HRW and several other NGOs because of links to the Hong Kong democracy movement. In January 2020, Roth said that he was denied entry to Hong Kong. He was planning to launch the organization's World Report, which had an essay saying China is a growing threat to human rights around the world. Geng Shuang, a spokesman for China's foreign ministry, told reporters he would not read the report, accusing Human Rights Watch of distorting the truth and claiming China's human rights situation is “the best it's been in history.” In August 2020, the Chinese government announced that it had imposed unspecified “sanctions” on Roth.

References

External links 

 Official HRW Biography of Kenneth Roth
 Lecture transcript and video of Roth's speech at the Joan B. Kroc Institute for Peace & Justice at the University of San Diego, September 2007

1955 births
Living people
American human rights activists
American lawyers
American people of German-Jewish descent
Brown University alumni
Human Rights Watch people
People from Elmhurst, Illinois
Yale Law School alumni